The Oditinae are a subfamily of small moths in the family Depressariidae.

Taxonomy and systematics
Amphitrias Meyrick, 1908
Odites Walsingham, 1891

References

 
Depressariidae
Moth subfamilies